Peter McDonnell (born 11 June 1953) is an English former professional footballer who played as a goalkeeper in England, the United States and Hong Kong.

Career
McDonnell was born Kendal, Westmorland, England. He began his professional career in 1973 with Bury, before being signed by Liverpool boss Bill Shankly after one year. He spent four years as reserve goalkeeper at Anfield, without making a first-team appearance. There were no substitute goalkeepers in domestic football in those days, and so McDonnell's only first-team squad involvement came in European football.

He was on the bench  for the 1977 European Cup Final, a game which Liverpool won. However, McDonnell's winner's medal was lost after the game, believed by some to have been stolen and given to one of Liverpool's first-team players who had missed the final. Following the arrival of Steve Ogrizovic, he was pushed down to third choice, and left to join Oldham Athletic in 1978.

He spent four years there, before heading to Dallas in the NASL, then to Hong Kong to play for Hong Kong Rangers, eventually returning home to represent a number of non-league clubs. He spent some time at Barrow in the Northern Premier League, and later the Football Conference and won the FA Trophy at Wembley Stadium in 1990.

Personal life
McDonnell is a referee in the North Lancashire and District Football League and is a Westmorland Football Association council member.

Honours
European Cup: 1976–77
UEFA Cup: 1975–76
FA Charity Shield: 1974, 1976, 1977
European Super Cup: 1977

References

External links
 Profile at LFCHistory.net
 NASL stats

Living people
1953 births
Sportspeople from Kendal
English footballers
Footballers from Cumbria
Association football goalkeepers
UEFA Champions League winning players
UEFA Cup winning players
North American Soccer League (1968–1984) players
Hong Kong First Division League players
Kendal Town F.C. players
Bury F.C. players
Liverpool F.C. players
Oldham Athletic A.F.C. players
Dallas Tornado players
Hong Kong Rangers FC players
Barrow A.F.C. players
Morecambe F.C. players
English football managers
Barrow A.F.C. managers
English expatriate footballers
English expatriate sportspeople in Hong Kong
Expatriate footballers in Hong Kong
English expatriate sportspeople in the United States
Expatriate soccer players in the United States